Sripathi Rao Peta is one of the villages of Kurnool district of Andhra Pradesh state in southern India, about 284 km from Hyderabad.

Political administration 

One of the Gram Panchayat at Atmakur mandal in Kurnool district

References

External links 

Villages in Kurnool district